Lipstick Jihad: A Memoir of Growing Up Iranian in America and American in Iran is Iranian-American writer Azadeh Moaveni's first book, published on February 4, 2005.

The book tells the story of the author's first-person experiences in Iran where she worked as a reporter after living in the United States her entire life. The book is part of a growing movement of female writers within the Iranian diaspora, including such other authors as Marjane Satrapi, Firoozeh Dumas, Nahid Rachlin, and Azar Nafisi.

References

2005 non-fiction books
Iranian books
American non-fiction books
Books about Iran
Asian-American literature